Elbella is a Neotropical genus of firetips in the family Hesperiidae.

Species
Elbella adonis (Bell, 1931) Argentina, Paraguay, Brazil
Elbella azeta (Hewitson, [1866]) Guatemala, Panama, Peru, Brazil
Elbella biscuspis de Jong, 1983 Suriname
Elbella blanda Evans, 1951) Peru
Elbella dulcinea (Plötz, 1879) Colombia
Elbella etna Evans, 1951 Bolivia, Argentina, Peru, Brazil
Elbella hegesippe (Mabille & Boullet, 1908)
Elbella intersecta (Herrich-Schäffer, 1869) Venezuela, Brazil, Peru
Elbella iphinous (Latreille, [1924]) Brazil
Elbella lamprus (Hopffer, 1874) Argentina, Paraguay, Brazil
Elbella lustra Evans, 1951 Colombia
Elbella luteizona (Mabille, 1877) Brazil
Elbella madeira Mielke, 1995 Brazil
Elbella mariae (Bell, 1931) Brazil
Elbella merops (Bell, 1934) Colombia
Elbella miodesmiata (Röber, 1925) Mexico, Colombia
Elbella patrobas (Hewitson, 1857) Mexico, Panama, Colombia, Peru, Brazil
Elbella patroclus (Plötz, 1879) Colombia, Bolivia, Ecuador, Argentina, Peru
Elbella rondonia Mielke, 1995 Brazil
Elbella scylla (Ménétriés, 1855) Mexico, Colombia, Bolivia, Peru
Elbella theseus (Bell, 1934) Brazil
Elbella viriditas (Skinner, 1920) Bolivia, Paraguay, Brazil

References
Natural History Museum Lepidoptera genus database

External links
images representing Elbella at Consortium for the Barcode of Life

Hesperiidae genera
Hesperiidae of South America